Marion Kirby was the head football coach for Greensboro College Pride football team from 1997–2001. He was the program's first-ever coach and compiled an overall record of 16–32–0. Kirby served as athletic director for Guilford College until 2007. In 2000 he was inducted into the North Carolina High School Athletic Association Hall of Fame.

Head coaching record

References

Living people
Greensboro Pride football coaches
Date of birth missing (living people)
Year of birth missing (living people)